Miraj Junction railway station[MRJ] is a major junction railway station in the city of Miraj, Maharashtra.The Pune – Yeshwantpur railway line passes through Miraj where it meets the Miraj – Kolhapur Branch line. The Miraj - Nagpur section starts at Miraj and passes through towns such as Pandharpur, Kurduvadi, Barshi, Latur, Parli Vaijnath and Osmanabad. Also it is major Junction on Mumbai - Miraj - Bangalore line and Miraj- Nagpur line (via Kurduvadi, Osmanabad, Purna and nanded.

Total Trains -87

Number of Platforms: 6

Number of Halting Trains: 56

Number of Originating Trains: 11

Number of Terminating Trains: 10

Rani Chennamma express

Rani Chennamma express from Miraj junction railway station to Bangalore City railway station is one of the most prestigious trains of the South Western Railway. The train covers an average distance of 749 km operating on a daily basis. This train also ran from Bengaluru to Miraj Junction as Kittur Express during Meter gauge Era.

Rani Chennamma express is commonly referred to as the 'Queen of South Western Railways'  with train number 16589/90.

History 
Miraj station, which is run by the Central Railway, has been established in the history of the Southern Maratha Railway Company. Railway lines were constructed between Koregaon and Miraj in June 1887 by the Southern Maratha Railway Company. Soon after the success of the railway on this route, the Miraj to Belgaum railway was constructed in December 1887. As the importance of Miraj station in Sangli district came to the attention of the South Maratha Railway Company, the company decided to rapidly expand the Miraj station and the trains running through this route.

was put By 1907, railway network had started to be built in Sangli, Kolhapur district in stages.

But the Southern Maratha Railway was merged with the Madras Railway Company. After that, Indian Railways took over the railway system from Madras Railway in 1944. But the Government of India had to wait till the year 1949 to take over the system in Miraj. Because at that time the Miraj-Kolhapur railway line was being run by Rajarshi Shahu Maharaj of Kolhapur and the Miraj-Sangli railway line was being run by Patwardhan Sarkar of Sangli. After the merger of the institutions, both these railway stations were taken over by the Government of India. From 1952, a start was made for the reorganization of the railways. After that, various departments of railways were established to expand the railways. Accordingly, both Miraj and Kolhapur stations were given to the then South-Central Railway. During that period, Pune-Bangalore, Miraj-Sangli, Miraj-Kolhapur meter gauge railway lines were given to South Central Railway and Miraj-Latur narrow gauge railway line was given to Central Railway. After that, the development of the expansion of the railway in Miraj has slowed down. Really boosted. Miraj to Koregaon completed in June 1887, Koregaon to Pune in November 1890

came Also Londa-Belgaum railway was started in 1887 and Belgaum Miraj railway was started in December 1887. As the number of passengers on the railway increased gradually, the trains were also expanded.

The task of creating identity for Miraj railway station was done by the then South Central and now South Western Railways. Miraj railway station was included in the Central Railway to give further impetus to the mainstreaming of the Miraj station on the Maharashtra border.

Background 
Before 1994, Miraj had a unique combination of three different gauges:

 Miraj-Pune and Miraj-Kolhapur, both with broad gauge lines,
 Miraj-Bangalore meter gauge line,
 Miraj-Pandharpur-Latur narrow gauge line.

By 2008, the entire Latur–Miraj section was converted from narrow gauge to broad gauge linking Miraj with Solapur and beyond. After gauge conversion completed, Miraj have only broad gauge lines.

Miraj had Steam loco shed in past near current Miraj- Bangalore line . Locomotives of Miraj loco shed was played up to Dharmawaram.After steam Locomotives was discontinued from service in 90's decade, Miraj loco shed was permanently closed. Trains like Bangalore Mail, Poona Mail, Kittur Express, Mandovi MG Express, Gomantak MG Express, Goa Express and Koyna Express once originated From Miraj Junction.

Even today, the legendary train Rani Chennamma express originates from Miraj Junction railway station.
Miraj junction have facility of coach maintenance and locomotive maintenance.All DEMU trains of Miraj-Kolhapur,Miraj-Pune,Miraj-Parali,Miraj-Satara and Miraj-Kurduwadi routs are maintained here.

Jaldoot water train 

Due to the drought the Latur city faced since three consecutive years, the summer of 2016 presented itself with extreme scarcity of water. To overcome this issue, a joint project was then requested by Railway Minister Suresh Prabhu and Maharashtra Chief Minister Devendra Fadnavis. After further research, and many changes in plan, Miraj was chosen to transport water to Latur from 342 km. The "Jaldoot" train made its first experimental run on 11 April 2016, carrying 10 tanker wagons, each filled with 50,000 litres of water.

Originating Trains of Miraj Jn. 
Banglore - Miraj [[Rani Chennamma Express|Rani Chennamma express]
Miraj Jn - Hubballi Express
Miraj Jn - Castlerock Express
Miraj Jn - Parli Demu Express.
Miraj Jn - Belagavi Passenger
Miraj Jn - Londa Express
Miraj Jn - Kolhapur passenger
Miraj Jn - Kurduwadi DEMU Special

Trains Passing Through Miraj Jn. 

 11045/Deekshabhoomi Express
 22497/Shri Ganganagar - Tiruchchirappalli Humsafar Express
 19668/Palace Queen Humsafar Express
 12629/Karnataka Sampark Kranti Express 
 11097/Poorna Express 
 17318/Dadar Central - SSS Hubballi Express
 17411/Mahalaxmi Express
 11021/Dadar Central - Tirunelveli Chalukya Express ( Via Yesvantpur) 
 11035/Sharavati Express
 11005/Dadar Central - Puducherry Express
 16505/Gandhidham - KSR Bengaluru Express
 16531/Ajmer - KSR Bengaluru Garib Nawaz Express 
 16209/Ajmer - Mysuru Express
 16533/Jodhpur - KSR Bengaluru Express
 16541/Yesvantpur - Pandharpur Weekly Express
 11030/Koyna Express
 12147/SCSMT Kolhapur - Hazrat Nizamuddin SF Express 
 11039/Maharashtra Express
 11046/Deekshabhoomi Express
 11403/Nagpur - Kolhapur Express 
 And so other Trains

Connecting Major Cities 

 Mumbai
 Pune
 Nagpur
 Ahemdabad
 Banglore
 Nashik
Delhi
And More

After completing doubling and electrification of the entire Pune-Miraj-Bangaluru line, many new trains will start from Miraj towards Chennai, Nanded, Howrah, Mangalore etc.

Station Expectation/lack of Facility 
Miraj railway station is always neglected by the railways. Not a single new train has been started from Miraj railway station in the last several years. Also, trains have not been extended to Miraj. Therefore, there is a need to expand the trains running to Pune and Hubli and start new trains from Miraj.

Hubli Division is desperate due to the indifference of Pune Division

A large number of passengers travel from Miraj railway station on all four routes namely Pune, Solapur, Belgaum and Kolhapur. But passengers are facing inconvenience as railway trains are not available. For this, expansion of railway trains along with introduction of new railway trains has been the demand of railway passenger organizations including Miraj Railway Action Committee for the last several years.

References

Railway junction stations in Maharashtra
Pune railway division
Railway stations in Sangli district